The NWA Southwest Texas Tag Team Championship was the secondary tag team championship in NWA Southwest.

Title history

See also
List of National Wrestling Alliance championships

References

Tag team wrestling championships
Professional wrestling in Texas
National Wrestling Alliance state wrestling championships